Noppawan Lertcheewakarn and Sally Peers were the defending champions, but both were ineligible to participate in the juniors.

Tímea Babos and Sloane Stephens defeated Irina Khromacheva and Elina Svitolina in the final, 6–7(7–9), 6–2, 6–2 to win the girls' doubles tennis title at the 2010 Wimbledon Championships.

Seeds

  Irina Khromacheva /  Elina Svitolina (final)
  Karolína Plíšková /  Kristýna Plíšková (quarterfinals)
  Ons Jabeur /  Monica Puig (semifinals)
  Tímea Babos /  Sloane Stephens (champions)
  Verónica Cepede Royg /  Cristina Dinu (semifinals)
  An-Sophie Mestach /  Silvia Njirić (quarterfinals)
  Nastja Kolar /  Chantal Škamlová (quarterfinals)
  Daria Gavrilova /  Ilona Kremen (second round)

Draw

Finals

Top half

Bottom half

References

External links

Girls' Doubles
Wimbledon Championship by year – Girls' doubles